Events from the year 1938 in Canada.

Incumbents

Crown 
 Monarch – George VI

Federal government 
 Governor General – John Buchan
 Prime Minister – William Lyon Mackenzie King
 Chief Justice – Lyman Poore Duff (British Columbia)
 Parliament – 18th

Provincial governments

Lieutenant governors 
Lieutenant Governor of Alberta – John C. Bowen
Lieutenant Governor of British Columbia – Eric Hamber
Lieutenant Governor of Manitoba – William Johnston Tupper
Lieutenant Governor of New Brunswick – Murray MacLaren
Lieutenant Governor of Nova Scotia – Robert Irwin 
Lieutenant Governor of Ontario – Albert Edward Matthews 
Lieutenant Governor of Prince Edward Island – George Des Brisay de Blois 
Lieutenant Governor of Quebec – Esioff-Léon Patenaude 
Lieutenant Governor of Saskatchewan – Archibald Peter McNab

Premiers 
Premier of Alberta – William Aberhart
Premier of British Columbia – Thomas Dufferin Pattullo 
Premier of Manitoba – John Bracken 
Premier of New Brunswick – Allison Dysart 
Premier of Nova Scotia – Angus Lewis Macdonald
Premier of Ontario – Mitchell Hepburn 
Premier of Prince Edward Island – Thane Campbell
Premier of Quebec – Maurice Duplessis 
Premier of Saskatchewan – William John Patterson

Territorial governments

Commissioners 
 Controller of Yukon – George A. Jeckell 
 Commissioner of Northwest Territories – Charles Camsell

Events
June 8 - Saskatchewan general election: William John Patterson's Liberals win a second consecutive majority

Full date unknown
Superman first appears in Action #1 (cover date June 1938), as a backup feature. The character is created by Joe Shuster (an artist for the Toronto Star) and American writer Jerry Siegel for National Comics.
Vaccination for tuberculosis (the leading cause of death in young people) is introduced.

Sport
April 12 - The Chicago Black Hawks win their second Stanley Cup by defeating the Toronto Maple Leafs 3 games to 1.
April 18 - The Manitoba Junior Hockey League's St. Boniface Seals win their only Memorial Cup by defeating the Ontario Hockey Association's Oshawa Generals 3 games to 2. The deciding Game 5 was played Maple Leaf Gardens in Toronto
December 10 - In a repeat of the 25th Grey Cup, the Toronto Argonauts win their fifth Grey Cup by defeating the Winnipeg Blue Bombers 30 to 7 in the 26th Grey Cup played at Varsity Stadium in Toronto

Births

January to June

January 9 - Claudette Boyer, politician, member of the Legislative Assembly of Ontario for Ottawa—Vanier (1999–2003) (d.2013)
January 10 - Frank Mahovlich, ice hockey player and Senator
January 13 - William B. Davis, actor
January 16 -  Lou Angotti, ice hockey player and coach (d. 2021)
February 9 - Jovette Marchessault, writer and artist (d. 2012)
February 17 - Martha Henry, actress
February 22 - Pierre Vallières, journalist and writer (d. 1998)
April 5 - David Helwig, poet, novelist, and essayist (d. 2018)
April 8 - John Hamm, physician, politician and 32nd Premier of Nova Scotia
April 12 - Roger Caron, author
May 13 - Lucille Starr, singer, songwriter and yodeler
May 16 - Jim Coutts, political advisor (d.2013)
May 24 - Tommy Chong, comedian, actor and musician
May 26 - Teresa Stratas, operatic soprano
May 30 - Eugene Belliveau, Canadian football defensive lineman
June 4 - John Harvard, journalist, politician and 23rd Lieutenant Governor of Manitoba
June 13 - John Newlove, poet (d.2013)
June 19
 Jean-Claude Labrecque, director and cinematographer
 Beth Phinney, educator and politician
June 26 - Ken Monteith, politician

July to September

July 12 - Matt Ravlich, ice hockey defenceman
July 14 - Moshe Safdie, architect and urban designer
July 18 - Helen Gardiner, philanthropist and co-founder of the Gardiner Museum (d.2008)
July 29 
 Peter Jennings, journalist and television news anchor (d.2005)
 Jean Rochon, politician (d. 2021)
August 1 - Noble Villeneuve, politician (d. 2018)
August 8 - Jacques Hétu, composer (d. 2010)
August 9 - Micheline Coulombe Saint-Marcoux, musician and composer (d.1985)
August 25 - Colin Thatcher, politician and murderer
August 28 - Paul Martin, politician and 21st Prime Minister of Canada

October to December

October 8 - Walter Gretzky, ice hockey player and coach (d.2021)
October 14 - Ron Lancaster, Canadian football player and coach (d.2008)
October 27 - Tim Ralfe, journalist (d.2000)
October 28 - Gary Cowan, golfer
November 3 - Yvon Cormier, wrestler (d.2009)
November 4 - LeRoy Fjordbotten, politician (d. 2017)
November 13 - Gérald Godin, poet and politician (d.1994)
November 15 - Denis DeJordy, ice hockey player and coach
November 17 - Gordon Lightfoot, singer and songwriter
November 18 – Annon Lee Silver, lyric soprano (d.1971)
November 26 - Rich Little, impressionist and voice actor
December 16 - John Allan Cameron, folk singer (d.2006)
December 22 - Lucien Bouchard, lawyer, diplomat, politician and Minister

Undated
Roland Doré, educator, President of the Canadian Space Agency

Deaths
January 4 - George Halsey Perley, politician and diplomat (b.1857)
January 8 - Aimé Bénard, politician (b.1873)
January 28 - Hugh Graham, 1st Baron Atholstan, newspaper publisher (b.1848)
February 20 - William Alves Boys, politician and barrister (b.1868)
March 23 - Thomas Walter Scott, politician and first Premier of Saskatchewan (b.1867)
April 13 - Grey Owl, writer and conservationist (b.1888)
April 24 - John Wycliffe Lowes Forster, artist (b.1850)
May 6 - Victor Cavendish, 9th Duke of Devonshire, politician and 11th Governor General of Canada (b.1868)
May 7 - Frederick Cronyn Betts, politician (b.1896)
July 25 - Francis Haszard, jurist, politician and Premier of Prince Edward Island (b.1849)
December 26 - Pierre-Ernest Boivin, politician and businessman (b.1872)

See also
 List of Canadian films

Historical Documents
Prime Minister Chamberlain defends Munich Agreement in "peace for our time" speech in British House of Commons

President Roosevelt requests increased defence appropriations from Congress

President Roosevelt says "we[...]are no longer a far away continent" in address at Queen's University at Kingston

Vancouverites fail in plot to bomb Japanese ocean liner Hiye Maru

Jewish Anti-Defamation League member says act on "passion for democracy" in face of world events

Jewish columnist sets radio host straight on his "joke" about Jews

Al Rashid Mosque, Canada's first, opened in Edmonton with Indian statesman and Hanna, Alta. mayor present

With prices for necessities and product sold dictated to them, Alberta farmers form United Farmers of Canada branch

Manitoba premier comments on globally higher production, lower demand and drastically lower prices for wheat

Development of huge Turner Valley oil field and its significance to Canada and Empire (especially British Navy)

Nellie McClung praises cooperation as solution to poverty resulting from "profit system divorced from Christian ethics"

Woonsocket, Rhode Island Franco-American mill worker and his family survive another layoff during Depression

Trans-Canada Air Lines will be part of multi-day international flights linking Britain with New Zealand and Australia

Tides and trees, gardens and exiles are subjects of Nellie McClung's Nova Scotia travel article

New wing of Kitchener-Waterloo YWCA hosts Saturday morning games, stories and handwork for girls

18th century Kanien’kéhà:ka-British alliance seen as "administration" of Indigenous people versus French "encroachments"

References

 
Years of the 20th century in Canada
Canada
1938 in North America
1930s in Canada